Got 2 Believe is a 2002 Filipino romantic comedy film starring Claudine Barretto and Rico Yan. The title originated from the popular song "Got to Believe in Magic" performed by David Pomeranz, and covered by Filipino band Side A, which was also the movie's theme song. It was a box office success in the Philippines. The movie was directed by Olivia Lamasan and produced by Star Cinema, the film production arm of ABS-CBN Corporation. This would be Rico Yan's last film before his death in March later that year.

Synopsis
Lorenz (Rico Yan) is a young wedding photographer who does not believe in happy endings. One day, he gets an offer from his cousin for a chance to be an international photographer. But here's the catch, he needs to have an exclusive pictorial with Toni (Claudine Barretto), who constantly appears in weddings being covered by him. Toni, tagged as the perennial bridesmaid, is a 25-year-old wedding coordinator. She creates the perfect weddings for her clients. She is believed to remain single for the rest of her life if she would not meet her Mr. Right at her current age – a family curse. But Toni refused to take the photoshoot being offered by Lorenz upon learning that he is the photographer who took all her awkward and candid photos published at random wedding magazines. Nevertheless, Lorenz succeeds to make Toni accept his offer when he promised to set the latter on a date with his bachelor friend who is based abroad. Toni takes the bargain. However, as Mr. Right comes to sweep her off her feet, she finds herself wishing that it should be Lorenz. Lorenz, on the other hand, is gradually falling for Toni. Will there be magical ending for them?

Cast and characters
Claudine Barretto as Antonia 'Toni' Villacosta
Rico Yan as Lorenz Montinola
Vhong Navarro as Rudolph
Dominic Ochoa as Perry
Nikki Valdez as Karen
Carlo Muñoz as Arnold
Noel Trinidad as Judge Villacosta
Wilma Doesnt as Catherine 'Cathy' Garcia
Maribeth Bichara as Aunt Cary
Jackie Castillejo as Aunt Ling
Nina Ricci Alagao as George
Angel Jacob as Tatet
Laura James as Thea

Film locations
 Tagaytay
 Manila
 Batangas

Legacy
Got 2 Believe is considered by critics as one of the greatest Filipino romantic movies of all time. Its movie structure has been a guideline and staple for Filipino romantic movies. In 2015, it was digitally remastered by the ABS-CBN Film Restoration.

Original Motion Picture Soundtrack
 Copyright 2002 by Star Recording, INC. Exclusively distributed by STAR RECORDING, INC.
 Got to Believe in Magic - performed by Side A, courtesy of Polyeast Records 
 I've Fallen for You - performed by Freshmen 
 Sana Ikaw - performed by Piolo Pascual and Stagecrew 
 Ikakasal Ka Na - performed by Jessa Zaragoza
 Believing in Magic - performed by Dianne Dela Fuente 
 Nang Dahil sa Pag-Ibig - performed by Tootsie Guevarra 
 Na-Develop - performed by Tin Arnaldo 
 Laging Ikaw Pa Rin - performed by Roselle Nava 
 Just for that Moment - performed by Jimmy Bondoc 
 Game Ka Na Ba (Bonus Track)
 Got to Believe in Magic (Bonus Track) - performed by Rico Yan & Claudine Barretto

References

External links
 

2002 films
Star Cinema films
Philippine romance films
Films directed by Olivia Lamasan
2000s romance films